Padavidhara (Kannada: ಪದವಿಧರ) is a 1967 Indian Kannada film, directed by C. V. Shivashankar and produced by C. K. Gowda. The film stars Udaykumar, Kalpana, T. N. Balakrishna and Narasimharaju in the lead roles. The film has musical score by R. Rathna.

Cast
Udaykumar
Kalpana
T. N. Balakrishna
Narasimharaju
M. N. Lakshmi Devi

Soundtrack 
The music was composed by Rathna.

References

External links
 

1960s Kannada-language films